Luke Arnold is an Australian actor and author, best known for playing John Silver in the Starz drama series Black Sails.

Early life
Arnold was born in Adelaide, South Australia and went to primary school there until his family moved to Sydney. He moved to Queensland for his last two years of high school at Sunshine Beach High School on the Sunshine Coast. At the age of 18, he worked as an assistant swordmaster on the 2003 film Peter Pan. He graduated from the Western Australian Academy of Performing Arts in 2006, and made his film debut as the lead in Broken Hill in 2009.

Career
On stage he appeared in Tim Conigrave's Like Stars in My Hands, directed by Robert Chuter at La Mama Courthouse, Melbourne in 2008. He appeared in television guest roles in City Homicide, McLeod's Daughters, and a recurring role in Winners & Losers.

In 2014, he appeared in two major television roles: playing INXS singer Michael Hutchence in INXS: Never Tear Us Apart, and as the pirate John Silver in the Starz drama series Black Sails. In 2017 he appeared in all six episodes of the second season of Australian paranormal drama Glitch. In 2018 he co-starred in the movie Half Magic as Freedom.

In January 2020, Hachette Australia published Arnold's first novel, The Last Smile in Sunder City.

Other roles 
 Arnold is an Ambassador for Save the Children Australia.

Works 

Luke Arnld Published a trilogy named The Fetch Phillips Archives, an urban fantacy story.

Novels 

 The Last Smile in Sunder City
 Dead Man in a Ditch
 One Foot in the Fade

Filmography

Films

Television

References

External links

1984 births
21st-century Australian male actors
Australian male film actors
Australian male television actors
Edith Cowan University alumni
Living people
Logie Award winners
Male actors from Adelaide